The fifth USS Ranger (SP-237) was United States Navy patrol vessel in commission from 1917 to 1919.

Ranger was built as the steam-driven, steel-hulled yacht Thomas Slocum by Robert Jacob Shipyard at City Island, Bronx, New York, in 1910. She later was renamed Ranger. The U.S. Navy purchased Ranger from her owner, T.W. Slocum of New York City, on 22 June 1917 for World War I service as a patrol vessel and commissioned her as USS Ranger (SP-237) on 9 October 1917.

Assigned to the 3rd Naval District, Ranger operated as a section patrol craft in the New York City area. She was renamed USS SP-237 in 1918.

SP-237 was decommissioned on 28 April 1919 and transferred to the Department of Commerce for use by the United States Coast and Geodetic Survey. She served with the department as  until either 26 November 1930 or 31 January 1931, when she was returned to the U.S. Navy. She was stricken from the Navy List on 4 September 1931 and sold on 21 December 1931.

In 1932, registry of the vessel was transferred to Panama.

Notes

References

Naval History and Heritage Command Online Library of Selected Images: U.S. Navy ships: USS Ranger (SP-237), 1917-1931. Renamed SP-237 in 1918. Originally the civilian steam yacht Ranger, built in 1910
NavSource Online: Section Patrol Craft Photo Archive USC&GS Ranger USS SP-237 ex-USS Ranger (SP 237)
NOAA History: Tools of the Trade: Coast and Geodetic Survey Ships: Ranger

Ships built in City Island, Bronx
1910 ships
Patrol vessels of the United States Navy
World War I patrol vessels of the United States
Steam yachts